Newcomb is an unincorporated community in Talbot County, Maryland, United States. Newcomb is located along Maryland Route 33 on the south bank of the Miles River, southeast of St. Michaels. It is located near a tract of land, which was once owned by Talbot County planter Robert Newcome (d. 1790).

References

Unincorporated communities in Talbot County, Maryland
Unincorporated communities in Maryland
Maryland populated places on the Chesapeake Bay